In mathematics, a càdlàg (French: "continue à droite, limite à gauche"), RCLL ("right continuous with left limits"), or corlol ("continuous on (the) right, limit on (the) left") function is a function defined on the real numbers (or a subset of them) that is everywhere right-continuous and has left limits everywhere. Càdlàg functions are important in the study of stochastic processes that admit (or even require) jumps, unlike Brownian motion, which has continuous sample paths. The collection of càdlàg functions on a given domain is known as Skorokhod space.

Two related terms are càglàd, standing for "continue à gauche, limite à droite", the left-right reversal of càdlàg, and càllàl for "continue à l'un, limite à l’autre" (continuous on one side, limit on the other side), for a function which at each point of the domain is either càdlàg or càglàd.

Definition

Let  be a metric space, and let . A function  is called a càdlàg function if, for every ,
 the left limit  exists; and
 the right limit  exists and equals f(t).
That is, f is right-continuous with left limits.

Examples

 All functions continuous on a subset of the real numbers are càdlàg functions on that subset.
 As a consequence of their definition, all cumulative distribution functions are càdlàg functions. In other words, the semi-open interval of concern for a two-tailed distribution  is right-closed.
 The right derivative  of any convex function  f defined on an open interval, is an increasing cadlag function.

Skorokhod space

Skorokhod space can be assigned a topology that, intuitively allows us to "wiggle space and time a bit" (whereas the traditional topology of uniform convergence only allows us to "wiggle space a bit"). For simplicity, take  and  — see Billingsley for a more general construction.

We must first define an analogue of the modulus of continuity, . For any , set
 
 

Now let Λ denote the set of all strictly increasing, continuous bijections from E to itself (these are "wiggles in time"). Let
 
denote the uniform norm on functions on E. Define the Skorokhod metric σ on D by
 
where  is the identity function. In terms of the "wiggle" intuition,  measures the size of the "wiggle in time", and  measures the size of the "wiggle in space".

It can be shown that the Skorokhod metric is indeed a metric. The topology Σ generated by σ is called the Skorokhod topology on D. 

An equivalent metric,
 
was introduced independently and utilized in control theory for the analysis of switching systems.

Properties of Skorokhod space

Generalization of the uniform topology

The space C of continuous functions on E is a subspace of D. The Skorokhod topology relativized to C  coincides with the uniform topology there.

Completeness

It can be shown that, although D is not a complete space with respect to the Skorokhod metric σ, there is a topologically equivalent metric σ0 with respect to which D is complete.

Separability

With respect to either σ or σ0, D is a separable space. Thus, Skorokhod space is a Polish space.

Tightness in Skorokhod space
By an application of the Arzelà–Ascoli theorem, one can show that a sequence (μn)n=1,2,... of probability measures on Skorokhod space D is tight if and only if both the following conditions are met:
 
and

Algebraic and topological structure
Under the Skorokhod topology and pointwise addition of functions, D is not a topological group, as can be seen by the following example:

Let  be a half-open interval and take  to be a sequence of characteristic functions.
Despite the fact that  in the Skorokhod topology, the sequence  does not converge to 0.

See also

References

Further reading 
 
 

Real analysis
Stochastic processes